The Horror at Oakdeene and Others is a collection of stories by author Brian Lumley.  It was released in 1977 and was the author's third book published by Arkham House.  It was published in an edition of 4,162 copies.  Many of the stories are of the Cthulhu Mythos.

Contents

The Horror at Oakdeene and Others contains the following stories:

 "The Viking's Stone"
 "Aunt Hester"
 "No Way Home"
 "The Horror at Oakdeene"
 "The Cleaner Woman"
 "The Statement of Henry Worthy"
 "Darghud's Doll"
 "Born of the Winds"

Sources

1977 short story collections
Fantasy short story collections
Horror short story collections
Short stories by Brian Lumley
Arkham House books